Customs is an authority or agency in a country responsible for collecting tariffs and for controlling the flow of goods, including animals, transports, personal effects, and hazardous items, into and out of a country. Traditionally, customs has been considered as the fiscal subject that charges customs duties (i.e. tariffs) and other taxes on import and export. In recent decades, the views on the functions of customs have considerably expanded and now covers three basic issues: taxation, security, and trade facilitation.

Each country has its own laws and regulations for the import and export of goods into and out of a country, enforced by their respective customs authorities; the import/export of some goods may be restricted or forbidden entirely. A wide range of penalties are faced by those who break these laws.

Overview

Taxation 
The traditional function of customs has been the assessment and collection of customs duties, which is a tariff or tax on the importation or, at times, exportation of goods. Commercial goods not yet cleared through customs are held in a customs area, often called a bonded store, until processed. Authorized ports are usually recognized customs areas.

Trade facilitation
A more recent objective of customs has been trade facilitation, which is the streamlining of processing of import and export of goods to reduce trade transaction costs. The contemporary understanding of the “trade facilitation” concept is based on the Recommendation No. 4 of UN/CEFACT “National Trade Facilitation Bodies”. According to its provisions (para. 14),

facilitation covers formalities, procedures, documents and operations related to international trade transactions. Its goals are simplification, harmonization and standardization, so that transactions become easier, faster and more economical than before.

Security 

The September 11, 2001 terrorist attacks in the United States has become the cardinal factor in prompting a significant strengthening of the security component of modern customs operations, after which security-oriented control measures for supply chains have been widely implemented for the aims of preventing risk identification. At airports today, customs functions as the point of no return for all passengers; once passengers have cleared customs, they cannot go back. Anyone arriving at an airport must also clear customs before they can officially enter a country. Those who breach the law will be detained by customs and likely returned to their original location. The movement of people into and out of a country is normally monitored by migration authorities, under a variety of names and arrangements. Border control authorities normally check for appropriate documentation, verify that a person is entitled to enter the country, apprehend people wanted by domestic or international arrest warrants, and impede the entry of people deemed dangerous to the country.

The most complete guidelines for customs security functions implementation is provided in the World Customs Organization Framework of Standards to Secure and Facilitate Global Trade (SAFE), which has had five editions in 2005, 2007, 2010, 2012, and 2018, respectively.

Privatization of customs

Customs is part of one of the three basic functions of a government, namely: administration; maintenance of law, order, and justice; and collection of revenue. However, in a bid to mitigate corruption, many countries have partly privatised their customs. This has occurred by way of contracting pre-shipment inspection agencies, which examine the cargo and verify the declared value before importation occurs. The country's customs is obliged to accept the agency's report for the purpose of assessing duties and taxes at the port of entry.

While engaging a pre-shipment inspection agency may appear justified in a country with an inexperienced or inadequate customs establishment, the measure has not been able to plug the loophole and protect revenue. It has been found that evasion of customs duty escalated when pre-shipment agencies took over. It has also been alleged that involvement of such agencies has caused shipping delays. Privatization of customs has been viewed as a fatal remedy. In many countries, import and export data are issued on the basis of national laws (Transparency Laws / Freedom of Information Act).

There has, however, been some speed bumps when transitioning customs over from the public to private sector. Factors such as an incompetent private sector, government's reluctance to change the traditional roles of customs, neglecting priority-setting and lack of transparency in the transition process have slowed the rate at which the public to private transition has taken place.

Red and green channels 

In many countries, customs procedures for arriving passengers at many international airports, ports and some road crossings are separated into red and green channels. Passengers with goods to declare (carrying goods above the permitted customs limits and/or carrying prohibited items) go through the red channel, while passengers with nothing to declare (carrying goods within the permitted customs limits and not carrying prohibited items) go through the green channel. However, entry into a particular channel constitutes a legal declaration, so that if a passenger going through the green channel is found to be carrying goods above the customs limits or prohibited items, he or she may be prosecuted for making a false declaration to customs, by virtue of having gone through the green channel. Each channel is a point of no return, once a passenger has entered a particular channel, they cannot go back.

Australia, Canada, New Zealand, and the United States do not officially operate a red and green channel system; however, some airports have adopted this layout.

Blue channel
Airports in EU countries also have a blue channel. As the EU is a customs union, travellers between EU countries do not have to pay customs duties. Value-added tax (VAT) and excise duties may be applicable if the goods are subsequently sold, but these are collected when the goods are sold, not at the border. Passengers arriving from other EU countries go through the blue channel, where they may still be subject to checks for prohibited or restricted goods. Luggage tickets for checked luggage travelling within the EU are green-edged so they may be identified. In the recent years usage of the blue channel has become limited mostly to flights between the Schengen Area member states of the EU and the remainder of EU member states, while flights which cross the border of neither the customs union nor the Schengen Area are in practice treated as domestic, and therefore, the people travelling on them do not go through customs channels at all.

Red point phone
All airports in the United Kingdom operate a channel system; however, some airports do not have a red channel, instead having a red point phone which serves the same purpose.

Summary of basic custom rules

Europe
The basic customs law is harmonized across Europe within the European Union Customs Union. This includes customs duties and restrictions. Customs tax from €22 to €150. In addition, see regulations of each member state.

For customs declarations in the EU and in Switzerland, Norway and Iceland, the "Single Administrative Document" (SAD) is used as a basis.

Germany

Up to €22, there are no taxes. From €22 up to €150, it is necessary to pay VAT (EUSt in Germany), which is 7% or 19% depending on the goods. From €150 it is necessary to pay VAT and customs.

Romania

Customs may be very strict, especially for goods shipped from anywhere outside the EU. Up to €10 goods/package.

Italy

Customs in Italy takes additional 22% VAT (Value-added tax) for goods imported from outside the European Union even if the VAT is already paid to the origin country sender.

Czech Republic and Slovakia
Up to €22, there are no taxes. From €22 up to €150, it is necessary to pay VAT (DPH in Czech/Slovak), which is 21%. From €150, it is necessary to pay VAT and customs. Customs may range from zero to 10% depending on the type of imported goods.

Ukraine 
Ukraine has had 5 reforms of its customs authorities. The recent one, in 2019, reorganized State Fiscal Service into the State Customs Service. The reform attempt seeks to digitize customs procedures, get market-level wages, innovate customs checkpoints,  integrate into EU customs community, open reference database of customs inspections.

The Americas

Canada

In 2003, Canada replaced the Canada Customs and Revenue Agency with the current Canada Border Services Agency (CBSA). The CBSA performs searches at Canadian ports of entry and detains illegal immigrants, along with preventing contraband from entering the country.

United States

Every person arriving in the US is subject to inspection by Customs and Border Protection (CBP) officers for compliance with immigration, customs and agriculture regulations. This public service is administered on almost a million visitors who enter the US daily. Travelers are screened for a number of prohibited items including; gold, alcoholic beverages, firearms and soil. A wide range of penalties face those non-compliers.

The United States imposes tariffs or "customs duties" on imports of goods, being 3% on average. The duty is levied at the time of import and is paid by the importer of record. Individuals arriving in the United States may be exempt from duty on a limited amount of purchases, and on goods temporarily imported (such as laptop computers) under the ATA Carnet system. Customs duties vary by country of origin and product, with duties ranging from zero to 81% of the value of the goods. Goods from many countries are exempt from duty under various trade agreements. Certain types of goods are exempt from duty regardless of source. Customs rules differ from other import restrictions. Failure to comply with customs rules can result in seizure of goods and civil and criminal penalties against involved parties. The CBP enforces customs rules. All goods entering the United States are subject to inspection by CBP prior to legal entry.

Uruguay
Uruguayan Customs place a cap on the importation of personal packages to up to 3 packages of a nominal value of no more than US$200 which can be entered into the country without extra charge. For a package to be included in the 3 free slots, the addressee must register the package with the Uruguayan Postal Service linking the tracking code, their address, national ID number phone and email address. Should a package arrive prior to registration the package must pay the 60% tax and no less than US$10. Any personal package worth more than US$200 or after the 3 free packages, must pay a 60% tax. This severely limits the public's ability to buy products online. Due to Uruguay's small population and market, many popular and specialty products are unavailable in the regular marketplace, forcing Uruguayans to strategically pool several purchases together and max each one of their free slots.

Argentina
Customs may be very strict. Goods valued up to US$500 brought in by plane and up to US$300 by sea or land are free of duties and taxes, cellphones and laptop computers are duty free regardless of their value only one per passenger, clothing and other personal use items are free of taxes. Above those values, tax is 50% of the value of all acquired goods summed up.

International Customs Day 
International Customs Day recognizes the role of agencies and customs officials in maintaining border security around the world. In focuses on the workers and their working conditions as well as the challenges that some customs officers face in their job. Custom agencies hold employee appreciation events where custom officers are recognized for their work. Several agencies also hold events for the public where they explain their jobs and responsibilities in a transparent manner.
Each year, at the end of January is celebrated the International Customs Day with a particular theme, as follows:

 2022, the chosen theme was 'Customs Digital Transformation by Embracing a Data Culture and Building a Data Ecosystem'.
 2021, the chosen theme was 'Customs bolstering Recovery, Renewal and Resilience for a sustainable supply chain'.
 2020, the chosen theme was 'Customs fostering Sustainability for People, Prosperity and the Planet'.
 2019, the chosen theme was 'SMART borders for seamless Trade, Travel and Transport'.
 2018, the chosen theme was 'A secure business environment for economic development'.
 Chosen theme for previous editions 2009 - 2018.

See also
 Customs Trade Partnership against Terrorism
 Duty (economics)
 Port authority
 World Customs Journal
 World Customs Organization

References

External links
 World Customs Organization
 EU Customs

Customs duties
Customs services
Export and import control
International law